Ted Leo & the Pharmacists: Dirty Old Town is a 2003 concert film by director Justin Mitchell documenting a day in the life of Ted Leo and the Pharmacists on Coney Island. The bulk of the footage is of the band's energetic performance at the Siren Music Festival, interspersed with interviews, boardwalk montages, and a cameo by comedian David Cross. Additionally, included as special features are a couple of songs performed live by just Ted Leo and a slideshow of pictures of Coney Island. This film is named after the old Ewan MacColl song "Dirty Old Town"; Leo performs a live cover of this song at the beginning of the movie.

External links 
 
 

2003 films
American documentary films
Concert films
2000s English-language films
2000s American films